General Sir Eric de Burgh  (10 May 1881 – 6 February 1973) was a British Indian Army officer who became Chief of the General Staff in India.

Military career
Educated at Marlborough College and the Colonial College, Hollesley Bay, De Burgh was commissioned into the 3rd (Militia) Battalion, Royal Dublin Fusiliers, as a Second Lieutenant in October 1901. In February 1902 he was seconded for service with Mounted infantry during the Second Boer War, with the local rank of Lieutenant in the Army whilst serving in South Africa. He later joined the Indian Army, and served in the 19th Lancers (Fane's Horse). He attended the Staff College, Camberley from 1913 to 1914.

He served in World War I and saw action at the Battle of Neuve Chapelle in March 1915, the Second Battle of Ypres in April 1915 and the Battle of Loos in September 1915. He later saw action at the Battle of the Somme in 1916, the Battle of Arras in April 1917 and the Battle of Cambrai in November 1917.

He also fought in the Third Anglo-Afghan War in 1919. He was appointed an instructor at Staff College, Quetta in 1928. He went on to be a Brigadier on the General Staff at Eastern Command in India in 1930, Commanding Officer of the 1st (Risalpur) Cavalry Brigade in 1931 and District Officer Commanding Lahore District in 1934. After that he attended the Imperial Defence College. He then became Deputy Chief General Staff at Army Headquarters India in 1935, District Officer Commanding Rawalpindi District in 1936 and General Officer Commanding 1st Indian Division in 1937. His last appointment was as Chief of the General Staff in India in 1939 at the start of World War II before retiring in 1941.

In retirement, he lived at Ard Cairn outside Naas, and in 1960, he acquired Bargy Castle in County Wexford.

Family

In 1923, he married Mary Fanshawe, daughter of General Sir Edward Fanshawe; they had two daughters. He was the maternal grandfather of singer Chris de Burgh.

References

Bibliography

External links
Generals of World War II

 

1881 births
1973 deaths
Academics of the Staff College, Quetta
Military personnel from County Kildare
Graduates of the Staff College, Camberley
Graduates of the Royal College of Defence Studies
British Indian Army generals
People educated at Marlborough College
British Army personnel of the Second Boer War
Indian Army personnel of World War I
British military personnel of the Third Anglo-Afghan War
Indian Army generals of World War II
Irish expatriates in India
Irish knights
Knights Commander of the Order of the Bath
Companions of the Distinguished Service Order
Officers of the Order of the British Empire
People from County Kildare
Royal Dublin Fusiliers officers
Royal Irish Fusiliers officers
Manchester Regiment officers